Myicolidae is a family of copepods belonging to the order Cyclopoida.

Genera:
 Conchocheres Sars, 1918
 Crucisoma Kabata, 1981
 Exostrincola Ho & Kim, 1992
 Myicola Wright, 1885
 Ostrincola Wilson, 1944
 Parostrincola Humes & Boxshall, 1988
 Pengna Ho & Kim, 1992
 Pseudomyicola Yamaguti, 1936

References

Copepods